Maurica breveti is a moth of the family Erebidae. It was described by Charles Oberthür in 1882. It is found in North Africa and Spain.

The wingspan is about 30 mm.

The larvae feed on Campanula, Convolvulus, Lavandula, Parietaria, Silene, Smilax and Asparagus species.

Subspecies
Maurica breveti breveti (Morocco)
Maurica breveti powelli (Oberthür, 1910)

References

Spilosomina
Moths described in 1882